Jurków  is a village in the administrative district of Gmina Dobra, within Limanowa County, Lesser Poland Voivodeship, in southern Poland.

The village has a population of 1,100.

References

Villages in Limanowa County